The boys' singles competition of the luge events at the 2012 Winter Youth Olympics in Innsbruck, Austria, was held on January 15, at the Olympic Sliding Centre Innsbruck. 25 athletes from 17 different countries took part in this event.

Results
Two runs were used to determine the winner.

References

 

Luge at the 2012 Winter Youth Olympics